Osnabrück-Land is an electoral constituency (German: Wahlkreis) represented in the Bundestag. It elects one member via first-past-the-post voting. Under the current constituency numbering system, it is designated as constituency 38. It is located in western Lower Saxony, comprising most of the district of Osnabrück.

Osnabrück-Land was created for the 1980 federal election. Since 2013, it has been represented by André Berghegger of the Christian Democratic Union (CDU).

Geography
Osnabrück-Land is located in western Lower Saxony. As of the 2021 federal election, it comprises the entirety of the Osnabrück district with the exception of the municipalities of Belm, Georgsmarienhütte, Hagen am Teutoburger Wald, Hasbergen, and Wallenhorst.

History
Osnabrück-Land was created in 1980 and contained parts of the abolished constituencies of Lingen, Osnabrück, and Nienburg. Until 1998, it was constituency 32 in the number system. In the 2002 and 2005 election, it was constituency 38. In the 2009 election, it was constituency 39. It has been constituency 38 since the 2013 election. Its borders have not changed since its creation.

Members
The constituency has been held by the Christian Democratic Union (CDU) since its creation. Its first representative was Reinhard Freiherr von Schorlemer, who served from 1980 to 2002. He was succeeded by Georg Schirmbeck, who served until 2013. André Berghegger has been representative since the 2013 election.

Election results

2021 election

2017 election

2013 election

2009 election

References

Federal electoral districts in Lower Saxony
1980 establishments in West Germany
Constituencies established in 1980